This is a list of the National Register of Historic Places listings in Seattle, Washington.

This is intended to be a complete list of the properties and districts on the National Register of Historic Places in the city of Seattle, Washington, United States. Latitude and longitude coordinates are provided for many National Register properties and districts; these locations may be seen together in an online map.

Of the 310 properties and districts listed on the National Register in King County, 219 are located in Seattle; these are listed below, while the remaining properties and districts are listed elsewhere. Four properties were once listed on the National Register in Seattle but have been removed.

Current listings

|}

Former listings

|}

See also
 List of Seattle landmarks   
 List of National Historic Landmarks in Washington   
 National Register of Historic Places listings in King County, Washington
 National Register of Historic Places listings in Washington state

References

External links

   

 N
 
History of Seattle
Seattle
Seattle, Washington
Historic